Tatiana Alexeyevna Minina (née Kudashova; born 18 April 1997) is a Russian taekwondo athlete. She won the silver medal at the 2017 World Taekwondo Championships in the women's bantamweight category when she was beaten by Zeliha Ağrıs from Turkey.

She is a three-time European champion, winning the gold medal at the 2016, the 2018 and the 2021 European Taekwondo Championships, all in the –53 kg weight category.

References 

1997 births
Living people
Russian female taekwondo practitioners
Universiade medalists in taekwondo
Taekwondo practitioners at the 2014 Summer Youth Olympics
Universiade silver medalists for Russia
World Taekwondo Championships medalists
European Taekwondo Championships medalists
Medalists at the 2015 Summer Universiade
Taekwondo practitioners at the 2020 Summer Olympics
Medalists at the 2020 Summer Olympics
Olympic medalists in taekwondo
Olympic silver medalists for the Russian Olympic Committee athletes
Olympic taekwondo practitioners of Russia
21st-century Russian women